Giuseppe Grezar (25 November 1918 – 4 May 1949) was an Italian football player, who played as a midfielder for Torino F.C. and died in the Superga air disaster together with the whole Grande Torino team.

Career
Grezar was born in Trieste. He played as a midfielder, debuting for Triestina. He was acquired by Torino in 1942.

With Torino, Grezar played 154 times and won five consecutive Serie A scudetti, until dying with most of the team in the Superga air disaster near Turin, in May 1949. He was capped eight times for the Italy national team, scoring one goal. He also played with Ampelea Isola in 1944.

The Stadio Giuseppe Grezar in Trieste is dedicated to him.

Honours

Club
Torino
Serie A: 1942–43, 1945–46, 1946–47, 1947–48, 1948–49
Coppa Italia: 1942–43

Individual
Torino F.C. Hall of Fame: 2016

References

External links
Statistics at Enciclopedia del Calcio website 

1918 births
1949 deaths
Association football midfielders
Italian footballers
Italy international footballers
Serie A players
Footballers from Trieste
Torino F.C. players
U.S. Triestina Calcio 1918 players
Footballers killed in the Superga air disaster